Raymond Karl Harmer is a former Member of the House of Keys for Glenfaba & Peel in the Isle of Man, and  the current Minister for Policy and Reform.

In 2015, he was elected an MHK in a by-election for Peel. In the 2016 general election, he contested the merged constituency of Glenfaba & Peel and was elected.

Governmental positions 
Member, Department of Health and Social Care 2015–2016
Member, Department of Infrastructure 2015–2016
Minister for Infrastructure 2016–2020
Minister for Policy and Reform 2020–present

2015

2016 

In 2014, Tynwald approved recommendations from the Boundary Review Commission which saw the reform of the Island's electoral boundaries.

Under the new system, the Island was divided into 12 constituencies based on population, with each area represented by two members of the House of Keys.

As a result, Peel's electoral boundaries were changed significantly to include the surrounding parishes of German and Patrick. These parishes had previously formed the constituency of Glenfaba.

Public service
Peel Commissioner
Treasurer of Peel Heritage Trust

References 

Members of the House of Keys 2011–2016
Members of the House of Keys 2016–2021
Living people
1968 births